The 2016 United States presidential election in Mississippi was held on Tuesday, November 8, 2016, as part of the 2016 United States presidential election in which all 50 states plus the District of Columbia participated. Mississippi voters chose electors to represent them in the Electoral College via a popular vote, pitting the Republican Party's nominee, businessman Donald Trump, and running mate Indiana Governor Mike Pence against Democratic Party nominee, former Secretary of State Hillary Clinton, and her running mate Virginia Senator Tim Kaine. Mississippi has six electoral votes in the Electoral College.

Mississippi has not voted Democratic since 1976. Since that time, Republicans have dominated the state's political elections, and so Trump was widely expected to win the state. Indeed, Trump carried it with 57.86% of the vote, while Clinton received 40.06%. Trump's 17.80% margin of victory was a 6.30% increase over the 11.50% margin of victory by which Republican nominee Mitt Romney won the state over Barack Obama in 2012. This also marked the first time since 1988 that Madison County voted more Democratic than the state as a whole. Trump became the first Republican to win the White House without carrying Oktibbeha County since Richard Nixon in 1968, as well as the first to do so without carrying Copiah, Pike, or Yazoo Counties since Ronald Reagan in 1980.

Primary elections

Democratic primary 
Fueled by robust support from black voters, Mrs. Clinton overwhelmed Mr. Sanders in Southern states. The Vermont senator barely competed in Mississippi and was still struggling to broaden his appeal beyond white, liberal voters

Republican primary 

Twelve candidates appeared on the Republican presidential primary ballot:
Donald Trump
Jeb Bush (withdrawn)
Ben Carson (withdrawn)
Chris Christie (withdrawn)
Ted Cruz
Carly Fiorina (withdrawn)
Mike Huckabee (withdrawn)
John Kasich
Rand Paul (withdrawn)
Marco Rubio
Rick Santorum (withdrawn)
Lindsey Graham (withdrawn)
George Pataki (withdrawn)

General Election

Polling

Predictions 
The following are final 2016 predictions from various organizations for Mississippi as of Election Day.

Statewide results

By congressional district
Trump won 3 of 4 congressional districts.

By county

Counties that flipped from Democratic to Republican
Benton (largest town: Hickory Flat)
Chickasaw (largest city: Houston)
Panola (largest city: Batesville)
Warren (largest city: Vicksburg)

See also 
Democratic Party presidential debates, 2016
Democratic Party presidential primaries, 2016
Republican Party presidential debates, 2016
Republican Party presidential primaries, 2016

References

External links
 RNC 2016 Republican Nominating Process 
 Green papers for 2016 primaries, caucuses, and conventions
 Decision Desk Headquarter Results for Mississippi

Missi
2016
Presidential